Napster was a peer-to-peer file sharing application. It originally launched on June 1, 1999, with an emphasis on digital audio file distribution. Audio songs shared on the service were typically encoded in the MP3 format. It was founded by Shawn Fanning, Sean Parker, and Hugo Sáez Contreras. As the software became popular, the company ran into legal difficulties over copyright infringement. It ceased operations in 2001 after losing a wave of lawsuits and filed for bankruptcy in June 2002.

Later, more decentralized projects followed Napster's P2P file-sharing example, such as Gnutella, Freenet, FastTrack, and Soulseek. Some services and software, like AudioGalaxy, LimeWire, Scour, Kazaa / Grokster, Madster, and eDonkey2000, were also brought down or changed due to copyright issues.

Napster's assets were eventually acquired by Roxio, and it re-emerged as an online music store. Best Buy later purchased the service and merged it with its Rhapsody service on December 1, 2011, rebranding back to Napster.

Origin
Napster was founded by Shawn Fanning and Sean Parker. Initially, Napster was envisioned by Fanning as an independent peer-to-peer file sharing service. The service operated between June 1999 and July 2001. Its technology allowed people to easily share their MP3 files with other participants. Although the original service was shut down by court order, the Napster brand survived after the company's assets were liquidated and purchased by other companies through bankruptcy proceedings.

History
Although there were already networks that facilitated the distribution of files across the Internet, such as IRC, Hotline, and Usenet, Napster specialized in MP3 files of music and a user-friendly interface. At its peak, the Napster service had about 80 million registered users. Napster made it relatively easy for music enthusiasts to download copies of songs that were otherwise difficult to obtain, such as older songs, unreleased recordings, studio recordings, and songs from concert bootleg recordings. Napster paved the way for streaming media services and transformed music into a public good for a brief time.

High-speed networks in college dormitories became overloaded, with as much as 61% of external network traffic consisting of MP3 file transfers. Many colleges blocked its use for this reason, even before concerns about liability for facilitating copyright violations on campus.

Macintosh version
The service and software program began as Windows-only. However, in 2000, Black Hole Media wrote a Macintosh client called Macster. Macster was later bought by Napster and designated the official Mac Napster client ("Napster for the Mac"), at which point the Macster name was discontinued. Even before the acquisition of Macster, the Macintosh community had a variety of independently developed Napster clients. The most notable was the open source client called MacStar, released by Squirrel Software in early 2000, and Rapster, released by Overcaster Family in Brazil. The release of MacStar's source code paved the way for third-party Napster clients across all computing platforms, giving users advertisement-free music distribution options.

Legal challenges
Heavy metal band Metallica discovered a demo of their song "I Disappear" had been circulating across the network before it was released. This led to it being played on several radio stations across the United States, which alerted Metallica to the fact that their entire back catalogue of studio material was also available. On March 13, 2000, they filed a lawsuit against Napster. A month later, rapper and producer Dr. Dre, who shared a litigator and legal firm with Metallica, filed a similar lawsuit after Napster refused his written request to remove his works from its service. Separately, Metallica and Dr. Dre later delivered to Napster thousands of usernames of people who they believed were pirating their songs. In March 2001, Napster settled both suits, after being shut down by the Ninth Circuit Court of Appeals in a separate lawsuit from several major record labels (see below). In 2000, Madonna's single "Music" was leaked out onto the web and Napster prior to its commercial release, causing widespread media coverage. Verified Napster use peaked with 26.4 million users worldwide in February 2001.

In 2000, the American musical recording company A&M Records along with several other recording companies, through the Recording Industry Association of America (RIAA), sued Napster (A&M Records, Inc. v. Napster, Inc.) on grounds of contributory and vicarious copyright infringement under the US Digital Millennium Copyright Act (DMCA). Napster was faced with the following allegations from the music industry:

 That its users were directly violating the plaintiffs' copyrights.
 That Napster was responsible for contributory infringement of the plaintiff's copyrights.
 That Napster was responsible for the vicarious infringement of the plaintiff's copyrights.

Napster lost the case in the District Court but then appealed to the U.S. Court of Appeals for the Ninth Circuit. Although it was clear that Napster could have commercially significant non-infringing uses, the Ninth Circuit upheld the District Court's decision. Immediately after, the District Court commanded Napster to keep track of the activities of its network and to restrict access to infringing material when informed of that material's location. Napster wasn't able to comply and thus had to close down its service in July 2001. In 2002, Napster announced that it had filed for bankruptcy and sold its assets to a third party. In a 2018 Rolling Stone article, Kirk Hammett of Metallica upheld the band's opinion that suing Napster was the "right" thing to do.

Promotional power

Along with the accusations that Napster was hurting the sales of the record industry, some felt just the opposite, that file trading on Napster stimulated, rather than hurt, sales. Some evidence may have come in July 2000 when tracks from English rock band Radiohead's album Kid A found their way to Napster three months before the album's release. Unlike Madonna, Dr. Dre, or Metallica, Radiohead had never hit the top 20 in the US. Furthermore, Kid A was an album without any singles released, and received relatively little radio airplay. By the time of the album's release, the album was estimated to have been downloaded for free by millions of people worldwide, and in October 2000 Kid A captured the number one spot on the Billboard 200 sales chart in its debut week. According to Richard Menta of MP3 Newswire, the effect of Napster in this instance was isolated from other elements that could be credited for driving sales, and the album's unexpected success suggested that Napster was a good promotional tool for music.

Since 2000, many musical artists, particularly those not signed to major labels and without access to traditional mass media outlets such as radio and television, have said that Napster and successive Internet file-sharing networks have helped get their music heard, spread word of mouth, and may have improved their sales in the long term. One such musician to publicly defend Napster as a promotional tool for independent artists was DJ Xealot, who became directly involved in the 2000 A&M Records Lawsuit. Chuck D from Public Enemy also came out and publicly supported Napster.

Lawsuit

Napster's facilitation of the transfer of copyrighted material raised the ire of the Recording Industry Association of America (RIAA), which almost immediately—on December 6, 1999—filed a lawsuit against the popular service. The service would only get bigger as the trial, meant to shut down Napster, also gave it a great deal of publicity. Soon millions of users, many of whom were college students, flocked to it. After a failed appeal to the Ninth Circuit Court, an injunction was issued on March 5, 2001 ordering Napster to prevent the trading of copyrighted music on its network.

Lawrence Lessig claimed, however, that this decision made little sense from the perspective of copyright protection: "When Napster told the district court that it had developed a technology to block the transfer of 99.4 percent of identified infringing material, the district court told counsel for Napster 99.4 percent was not good enough. Napster had to push the infringements 'down to zero.' If 99.4 percent is not good enough," Lessig concluded, "then this is a war on file-sharing technologies, not a war on copyright infringement."

Shutdown
On July 11, 2001, Napster shut down its entire network to comply with the injunction. On September 24, 2001, the case was partially settled. Napster agreed to pay music creators and copyright owners a $26 million settlement for past, unauthorized uses of music, and as an advance against future licensing royalties of $10 million. To pay those fees, Napster attempted to convert its free service into a subscription system, and thus traffic to Napster was reduced. A prototype solution was tested in 2002: the Napster 3.0 Alpha, using the ".nap" secure file format from PlayMedia Systems and audio fingerprinting technology licensed from Relatable. Napster 3.0 was, according to many former Napster employees, ready to deploy, but it had significant trouble obtaining licenses to distribute major-label music. On May 17, 2002, Napster announced that its assets would be acquired by German media firm Bertelsmann for $85 million to transform Napster into an online music subscription service. The two companies had been collaborating since the middle of 2000 where Bertelsmann became the first major label to drop its copyright lawsuit against Napster. Pursuant to the terms of the acquisition agreement, on June 3 Napster filed for Chapter 11 protection under United States bankruptcy laws. On September 3, 2002, an American bankruptcy judge blocked the sale to Bertelsmann and forced Napster to liquidate its assets.

Reuse of name

Napster's brand and logos were acquired at a bankruptcy auction by Roxio which used them to re-brand the Pressplay music service as Napster 2.0. In September 2008, Napster was purchased by US electronics retailer Best Buy for the US $121 million. On December 1, 2011, pursuant to a deal with Best Buy, Napster merged with Rhapsody, with Best Buy receiving a minority stake in Rhapsody. On July 14, 2016, Rhapsody phased out the Rhapsody brand in favor of Napster and has since branded its service internationally as Napster and expanded toward other markets by providing music on-demand as a service to other brands like the iHeartRadio app and their All Access music subscription service that provides subscribers with an on-demand music experience as well as premium radio.

On August 25, 2020, Napster was sold to virtual reality concerts company MelodyVR.

On May 10, 2022, Napster was sold to Hivemind and Algorand. The investor consortium also includes ATC Management, BH Digital, G20 Ventures, SkyBridge, RSE Ventures, Arrington Capital, Borderless Capital, and others.

Media 
 There have been several books that document the experiences of people working at Napster, including:
 Joseph Menn's Napster biography
 All the Rave: The Rise and Fall of Shawn Fanning's Napster 
 John Alderman's "Sonic Boom: Napster, MP3, and the New Pioneers of Music" 
 Steve Knopper's "Appetite for Self Destruction: The Spectacular Crash of the Record Industry in the Digital Age."
 The 2003 film The Italian Job features Napster co-founder Shawn Fanning as a cameo of himself. This gave credence to one of the characters fictional back-story as the original "Napster". 
 The 2010 film The Social Network features Napster co-founder Sean Parker (played by Justin Timberlake) in the rise of the popular website Facebook. 
 The 2013 film Downloaded is a documentary about sharing media on the Internet and includes the history of Napster.

See also 
 Album era
 Gnutella
 BitTorrent
 Napster (streaming music service)
 Snocap

Further reading

InsightExpress. 2000. Napster and its Users Not violating Copyright Infringement Laws, According to a Survey of the Online Community.

 
 Judge criticises both parties in Napster case
 "The File Sharing Movement" in Jack Goldsmith and Tim Wu, Who Controls the Internet: Illusions of a Borderless World Oxford University Press, 2006, pp. 105–125.

References

External links
Official website in 2011 on archive.org
 Official website in 2022

Defunct digital music services or companies
Defunct online companies of the United States
1999 software
File sharing networks
File sharing software
Internet properties established in 1999
Internet services shut down by a legal challenge
American companies established in 1999
Entertainment companies established in 1999
Software companies established in 1999
Internet properties disestablished in 2001
Technology companies disestablished in 2001
Companies that have filed for Chapter 7 bankruptcy
Companies that filed for Chapter 11 bankruptcy in 2002
Classic Mac OS software
Windows file sharing software
Web 2.0